The State Museum of Prehistory (Landesmuseum für Vorgeschichte) in Halle (Saale) is the archaeological museum of the German state of Saxony-Anhalt.

Founded in Naumburg in 1819, it was moved to Halle in 1825, and within Halle to its present location in 1918.

Its collection, comprising more than 15 million items, is among the most extensive and important in Germany. Among its most famous exhibits are the Nebra sky disk (Unetice culture), which has been part of the permanent exhibition since 2008, the Eulau family graves (Corded Ware culture) and the Hornhausen rider stele (Francia).

History 
The Museum was founded by the Thüringisch-Sächsischer Verein für Erforschung des vaterländischen Alterthums und Erhaltung seiner Denkmale in Naumburg on October 3, 1819. In 1823, the collection was moved to Halle.

External links

Official website
Profile of the museum with links to its digitized objects and collections on museum-digital.de

Museums in Saxony-Anhalt
Archaeological museums in Germany